
This is a list of aircraft in alphabetical order beginning with 'S'.

Sl

Sleiters 
 Sleiters IS-1

Slepcev 
(Storch Aircraft Serbia/Nestor Slepcev)
 Slepcev Storch
 Slepcev Storch Microlight
 Slepcev Super Storch
 Slepcev Storch Moose

Slick 
 Slick 360

Sling Aircraft 
 Sling Aircraft Sling 2
 Sling Aircraft Sling 4
 Sling Aircraft Sling TSi
 Sling Aircraft Sling HW

Slingsby 
(Slingsby Sailplanes/Slingsby Aviation)
 Slingsby T.10 Kirby Kitten 
 Slingsby T.11 Kirby Twin
 Slingsby T.40 Hayhow
 Slingsby T.57 Sopwith Camel replica
 Slingsby T.58 Rumpler C.IV replica
 Slingsby T.61 Falke
 Slingsby T.66 Nipper
 Slingsby T.67 Firefly
 Slingsby T-3A Firefly
 Slingsby CT-111 Firefly Canadian Armed Forces
 Slingsby CAMCO V-Liner
 Slingsby-Baynes Bat (not their design, but built by the company)

Slinn 
((James B) Slinn Aeroplane Co, Chillicothe, Illinois, United States)
 Slinn 1911 Monoplane

SlipStream 
 SlipStream Dragonfly
 SlipStream Genesis
 SlipStream Genesis XL
 SlipStream Revelation
 SlipStream Skyblaster
 SlipStream SkyQuest
 SlipStream Scepter
 SlipStream Ultra Sport

Sloan 
(Sloan Aero Corp; Sloan Aircraft Co, Bound Brook, New Jersey, United States)
 Sloan H-1
 Sloan H-2
 Sloan H-3 Trainer

Slyusarneko
( V.V. Slyusarenko)
 Slyusarneko 1918 monoplane

References

Further reading

External links

 List Of Aircraft (S)

de:Liste von Flugzeugtypen/N–S
fr:Liste des aéronefs (N-S)
nl:Lijst van vliegtuigtypes (N-S)
pt:Anexo:Lista de aviões (N-S)
ru:Список самолётов (N-S)
sv:Lista över flygplan/N-S
vi:Danh sách máy bay (N-S)